Na Chueak is a district (amphoe) in the south of Maha Sarakham province, northeastern Thailand.

Geography
Neighboring districts are (from the north clockwise): Kut Rang, Borabue, Wapi Pathum, Na Dun, and Yang Sisurat of Maha Sarakham Province; Na Pho of Buriram province; and Nong Song Hong and Pueai Noi of Khon Kaen province.

History
The area was made a minor district (king amphoe) on 19 July 1960 by splitting it off from Borabue district. It was upgraded to a full district in 1963.

Administration
The district is divided into 10 sub-districts (tambons), which are further subdivided into 146 villages (mubans). Na Chueak is a sub-district municipality (thesaban tambon) which covers parts of tambons Na Chueak and Khwao Rai. There are a further 10 tambon administrative organizations (TAO).

References

External links
amphoe.com (Thai)

Na Chueak